Faris Khenniche (born 12 August 1981) is an Algerian footballer who plays as a midfielder for MC Alger.

Career
Born in Sétif, Algeria, Khenniche moved to the Mont-Mesly quarter of Créteil at a young age. He began playing amateur football for US Créteil-Lusitanos and joined the senior squad for three seasons in Ligue 2.

Créteil were relegated to the Championnat National, and in 2009, Khenniche joined Algerian side MC Alger.

References

External links
 
 
 

1981 births
Living people
Algerian footballers
Association football forwards
French people of Kabyle descent
US Créteil-Lusitanos players
Kabyle people
Footballers from Sétif